The Middelburg Center for Transatlantic Studies, or MCTS, is based in Middelburg, The Netherlands.

The MCTS brings students and faculty together from both sides of the Atlantic Ocean in the spirit of intercultural understanding and dialogue.

More than 35 universities are members of this unique international network.  Students and faculty gather in Middelburg, in the Netherlands, for the purposes of  collaboration in research, teaching, and exchange amongst partner institutions in Mexico, the USA, and Europe.

The MCTS offers undergraduates semester-long study abroad programs.  Summer sessions are also possible.  The MCTS courses focus on a comparative, multidisciplinary approach to transatlantic relationships and developments. Staff and students from consortium institutions gather in a central location to form an interactive, international learning community.

The mission statement of the program:

"The Middelburg Center for Transatlantic Studies seeks to encourage and promote a transatlantic perspective by providing faculty and students with a unique multicultural environment in order to aid their personal, professional, and academic development."

In October 2009, the MCTS moved into its new home in the former Latin School.

External links
Official Website of the Middelburg Center for Transatlantic Studies
The Times of London Covers MCTS Opening
Photo Essay of Middelburg by Photographer Niek Haak
Dutch newspaper article about the start of MCTS in Middelburg

Middelburg, Zeeland
Education in Zeeland